Babylonia pieroangelai is a species of sea snail, a marine gastropod mollusk in the family Babyloniidae. It takes its name in honour of Piero Angela.

References

pieroangelai